Lamellarins are a group of pyrrole alkaloids first isolated in 1985 from the marine mollusk Lamellaria in the waters of Palau. Over 70 lamellarins and similar compounds were subsequently isolated. Other similar compounds include ningalins, lukianols, polycitones, and storniamides.

Biological activity
These compounds have shown a wide variety of biological activity, including reversal of multidrug resistance, HIV-1 integrase inhibition, and antibiotic activity. Lamellarin D, for example, displays strong cytotoxic activity against tumor cell lines, and is a potent topoisomerase I inhibitor.

Structure
The lamellarins all contain a central pyrrole ring, substituted at the 3 and 4 positions by polyhydroxy- or methoxyphenyls. They are divided into two groups, depending on whether the pyrrole ring is fused or unfused.

Synthesis
The lamellarins have been synthesized by a number of groups, including Isibashi, Steglich, Ruchirawat, Banwell, Alvarez, Gupton, Boger, and Handy.

Steglich synthesis of lamellarin G trimethyl ether
The Steglich synthesis features an oxidative coupling of two benzylic carbons, as well as a Paal-Knorr pyrrole synthesis.

Banwell synthesis of lamellarin K
The Banwell group’s synthesis of lamellarin K includes an intramolecular azomethine ylide cyclization.

Gallery

See also
 Pyrrole

References 

Pyrroles
Isoquinoline alkaloids